The 1956–57 Colorado College Tigers men's ice hockey team represented Colorado College in college ice hockey. In its 2nd year under head coach Tom Bedecki, the team compiled a 25–5–0 record, outscored opponents 205 to 106, and won the 1957 NCAA Men's Ice Hockey Tournament. The Tigers defeated Michigan 13–6 in the championship game at the Broadmoor World Arena in Colorado Springs, Colorado. CC tied the record for the most goals scored in a championship game (1950) and combined with the Wolverines for the most total goals in a title game (19). As of 2018 this is the last time Colorado College has won the national title in ice hockey.

Season
After appearing in the first five national tournaments Colorado College had made the championship once in the next four years. CC's fortunes turned the year before when Bill Hay, a standout junior player from Saskatchewan hitchhiked down to Colorado Springs and was able to talk both himself and his fried Bob McCusker into athletic scholarships. Both players made their varsity debut in 1956–57, as did much of the team, and the Tigers quickly jumped to the top of the standings. After opening the regular season against two junior teams from Canada, CC welcomed four different collegiate opponents into their building and won every single game.

With the Tigers sporting a 12-0 record they hit the road for the first time but didn't have to leave the state when they travelled to Denver to face the Pioneers. Colorado College's perfect record was spoiled with a 3–6 defeat but the returned the favor the next night at home, beating their in-state rival 8–7 in overtime. The Tigers hosted another pair of Canadian junior teams before heading north to face an improving Fighting Sioux team and lost both matches. Two days later CC finally won its first road game of the season, beating Minnesota twice before returning to Colorado to take the second home-and-home series against Denver. After redeeming themselves against North Dakota in two home wins the Tigers split a road series with Michigan Tech to close out their season.

Despite CC's struggles on the road the team was able to win the WIHL title handily and, with a superb 19–1 home record, post the best season in team history (As of 2018). Colorado College was led back to the NCAA tournament by Hay and McCusker who finished first (tied) and third in scoring in the nation. Both players earned their way onto one of the two All-American Teams as did team captain Don Wishart and all three players were first-team All-WIHL.

Befitting the western champion, Colorado College was selected as the #1 seed in the west and opened the tournament against Clarkson who had compiled an undefeated season the year before and followed that up with a stellar 18–2 mark. Despite the two teams' success the Golden Knights were completely outmatched by older and larger CC team. While the final score was relatively close, 5–3 with a hat-trick from Bob McCusker, the Tigers nearly tripled the number of shots from Clarkson (60–21) and the Green and Gold couldn't score enough to reward the valiant effort from the goaltender Eddie MacDonald.

In the title tilt CC found itself pitted against two-time defending champion Michigan who had won five of the six national titles since CC earned its first championship in 1950. The Wolverines had utterly dominated the series between the two teams over the previous decade and won all three games the pair played in the NCAA Tournament despite every game being played at the Broadmoor World Arena. None of those losses, however, had come with Hay and McCusker on the team and the two sophomores combined to score the first three goals of the contest. Showing the championship mettle, Michigan responded with three of their own before the first period was over and erased the CC advantage. CC goalie Bob Southwood settled down in the second period and when the Tigers scored three more times the Wolverines could only muster one in response. Even with a two-goal lead the Tigers didn't pull back in the third and after McCusker opened the scoring with his third of the game the rest of the team followed suit and score five more times before Michigan got its fifth but by then it was far too late and the Tigers eventually cruised to a 13–6 victory, winning their second National Title.

Bob McCusker tied the NCAA records for goals (4) and points (6) in a championship game and was the logical choice for Most Outstanding Player. McCusker was accompanied by Bill Hay and Don Wishart on the All-Tournament First Team while Dick McGhee and John Andrews made the Second Team.

Standings

Schedule
Conference games against Michigan State, Michigan Tech and Minnesota were only worth 1 point in the standings.

|-
!colspan=12 style=";" | Exhibition

|-
!colspan=12 style=";" | Regular Season

|-
!colspan=12 style=";" |

Roster and scoring statistics

Colorado College players are reported to have collectively scored 212 goals over the course of the season but the team only scored 199 times (during the regular season).

Goaltending statistics

1957 championship game

(W1) Colorado College vs. (W2) Michigan

See also
1957 NCAA Division I Men's Ice Hockey Tournament
List of NCAA Division I Men's Ice Hockey Tournament champions

References

Colorado College Tigers men's ice hockey seasons
Colorado College
Colorado College
Colorado College
Colorado College
Colorado College
Colorado College